Erik Daniel Pappas (born April 25, 1966) is an American former  professional baseball player and coach. He played as a catcher in Major League Baseball for the Chicago Cubs and St. Louis Cardinals.

Baseball career
Born in Chicago, Illinois, Pappas was drafted by the California Angels as the 6th overall pick in the first round of 1984 Major League Baseball draft. He made his major league debut with the Chicago Cubs on April 19, 1991, at the age of 24. He appeared in 8 games for the Cubs during the 1991 season and appeared in a total of 97 games for the Cardinals during 1993 and 1994 seasons. During the 1993 season, he had one home run and 28 RBIs. Pappas played in his final major league game on April 30, 1994, at the age of 28. On August 13, 1996, while a member of the Texas Rangers' Triple-A Oklahoma City 89ers, Pappas caught a perfect game pitched by Rick Helling against the Nashville Sounds. Pappas, who is of Greek ancestry, was selected to play for the Greek national baseball team in the 2004 Summer Olympics in Athens, Greece.

Career statistics
In a three-year major league career, Pappas played in 104 games, accumulating 70 hits in 289 at bats for a .242 career batting average along with 1 home run, 35 runs batted in and a .342 on-base percentage. He ended his career with a .978 fielding percentage.

Coaching career
After his playing career, Pappas became the hitting coach for the Peoria Chiefs. Pappas spent 2006–12 at the Cangelosi Baseball Academy in Orland Park, Illinois, while also serving as a scout for the Texas Rangers from 2005 to 2009. Pappas became a coach in the Cardinals system as the Springfield Cardinals Hitting Coach for the 2014 season.

Pappas currently resides in the Beverly neighborhood in Chicago, Illinois.

References

External links

1966 births
Living people
American expatriate baseball players in Canada
American people of Greek descent
Baseball players at the 2004 Summer Olympics
Baseball coaches from Illinois
ChicagoCharlotte Knights players
Chicago Cubs players
Iowa Cubs players
Louisville Redbirds players
Major League Baseball catchers
Midland Angels players
Minor league baseball coaches
Oklahoma City 89ers players
Olympic baseball players of Greece
Omaha Royals players
Palm Springs Angels players
Quad Cities Angels players
Salem Angels players
Sportspeople from Chicago
St. Louis Cardinals players
Texas Rangers scouts
Vancouver Canadians players
Baseball players from Chicago